LaGrange was a small town, now extinct, in Shelby Township, Tippecanoe County, in the U.S. state of Indiana.

History
LaGrange was founded in 1827 by Isaac Shelby, and was named for the Marquis de Lafayette's ancestral home in France. The community was laid out with eight streets and a hotel. The decline of riverboat trade and the decision to build the Wabash Railroad on the other side of the Wabash River led to the town's extinction.

A post office was established at LaGrange in 1828, and remained in operation until it was discontinued in 1835.

Geography

References

Former populated places in Tippecanoe County, Indiana
Former populated places in Indiana